The More Today Than Yesterday: The Greatest Hits Tour
is a concert tour by American recording artist Diana Ross. Primarily visiting the United States and Canada, the tour showcases Ross' greatest hits that span her nearly 50 years in the music industry. The tour was well received by critics and fans. The first leg of the tour earned over four million dollars, finishing at 66th place on Pollstar's "Top 100 North American Tours".

Background
The tour was announced in March 2010 as a summer tour, visiting over 17 cities in the United States. Due to public demand, the tour was expanded in the fall of 2010 to include additional dates in the U.S. and Canada. Further expansion came in 2011 with an additional 17 dates planned. To introduce the tour, Ross stated, "We work our way up: The ’60s — The Supremes — the 70's and the ’80s and 'I’m Coming Out' [...] The music is timeless, I must say, especially the Motown music; it's timeless and it's really special."

Set list

Tour dates

Festivals and other miscellaneous appearances
This concert was a part of the "Live at the Garden" concert series
This concert was a part of the "25th Annual Leukemia Ball"
This concert was a part of "Universal Studios Mardi Gras"
This concert is a part of the "Young Variety Night of the Rising Stars"

Cancellations and rescheduled shows

Box office score data

Critical reception
The first leg of the tour received positive feedback from music critics. Jim Farber (New York Daily News) praised the performance at the Radio City Music Hall noting,  "In fact, the show found her quite engaged, banishing the cynicism so many well-seasoned stars betray on their nine millionth run through the hits. (If you want to see that sort of cynicism, buy a ticket to the next Aretha Franklin concert). By contrast, Ross seemed entirely present, delivering full versions of the hits instead of the usual bum's rush of medleys. Then again, most of these songs last no more than 3 minutes, so that wasn't exactly a Herculean feat." Emily Stokes (Financial Times) gave the same concert four out of five stars. She wrote,  "A final rendition of "You Are Not Alone" secured her place as the fairy godmother of Motown. "If you need me, call me", she advised the audience, before leaving the stage to change out of her final, silver dress."

Jane Stevenson (Toronto Sun) gave the performance at the Roy Thomson Hall four out of five stars writing, "Even her eyes were big as she stared out into the audience and took them through her impressive 50-year career of Motown soul, blues, gospel, disco, and pop starting with the ho-hum late ‘70s hit The Boss and before quickly moving into Supremes era-gold like "More Today Than Yesterday", Reflections, You Can’t Hurry Love, Stop In The Name of Love, You Keep Me Hanging On, and the granddaddy of them all – Love Child." Mark Jordan (Go Memphis)  described Ross' performance at the Memphis Botanic Garden "regal". He further commented, "And at the center of it all was Ross — commanding the stage, pulling off quick costume changes, and keeping the show's breakneck pace on time — setting a pace that would have left even her younger, modern-day successors like Beyoncé winded."

Greg Haymes (Times Union) stated Ross throw out her "diva" attitude for the concert at the Palace Theatre. He wrote, "Ross was in fine voice throughout the evening, and she got sensuous and sultry with Bert Bacharach's classic 'The Look of Love' and a pair of Billie Holiday gems -- the bluesy 'Fine and Mellow' and 'Don't Explain'—but she didn't really make them her own the way she did with 'Touch Me in the Morning.' Those who attended the show at Hard Rock Live agreed with Veda Jo Jenkins (The Palm Beach Post). She stated, "From the club classic to the love ballads like "Touch Me in the Morning", Ross’ performance was old school. No fanfare, no big video screens with hi-def graphics, just her solo with an outrageous horn section that truly accentuated her voice and the mood."

References

External links
Ross' Official Facebook Page

Diana Ross concert tours
2010 concert tours
2011 concert tours
2012 concert tours